The Yesvantpur–Vasco da Gama Express is an Express train belonging to South Western Railway zone that runs between  and  in India. It is currently being operated with 17309/17310 train numbers on bi-weekly basis.

Service

The 17309/Yesvantpur–Vasco da Gama Express has an average speed of 43 km/hr and covers 663 km in 14hr. The 17310/Vasco da Gama–Yesvantpur Express has an average speed of 45 km/hr and covers 663 km in 14h 10m. If you know that from Bangalore via Yesvantpur Junction to Goa only 5 (rail) trains were survival between these two cities.

Schedule

Route and halts 

The important halts of the train are:

Coach composite

The train has standard ICF rakes with a max speed of 110 kmph. The train consists of 24 coaches :

 2 AC II Tier
 3 AC III Tier
 12 Sleeper coaches
 1 Pantry car
 4 General Unreserved
 2 Seating cum Luggage Rake

Traction

Both trains are hauled by a Krishnarajapuram Loco Shed-based WDP-4 and WDM-3D diesel locomotive from Yesvantpur to Vasco da Gama and vice versa.

Rake sharing 

The train shares its rake with 17315/17316 Vasco da Gama–Velankanni Weekly Express, 17311/17312 Chennai Central–Vasco da Gama Weekly Express, 12741/12742 Vasco da Gama–Patna Superfast Express.

Notes

See also 

 Vasco da Gama railway station
 Yesvantpur Junction railway station
 Vasco da Gama–Patna Superfast Express
 Vasco da Gama–Velankanni Weekly Express
 Chennai Central–Vasco da Gama Weekly Express

References

External links 

 17309/Yesvantpur-Vasco da Gama Express
 17310/Vasco da Gama-Yesvantpur Express

Transport in Vasco da Gama, Goa
Transport in Bangalore
Express trains in India
Rail transport in Goa
Rail transport in Karnataka
Railway services introduced in 2001